The Rastriya Prajatantra Party (()) is a liberal democratic, constitutional monarchist and Hindu nationalist political party in Nepal.

The party was formed by Panchayat era prime ministers Surya Bahadur Thapa and Lokendra Bahadur Chand in 1990. The party led two coalition governments in 1997 under Thapa and Chand. The two were also appointed prime minister by King Gyanendra in the 2000s; Chand in 2002 and Thapa in 2003. 

Rajendra Prasad Lingden is currently serving as party chairman after being elected at the party's general convention in December 2021. Rastriya Prajatantra Party is currently the fifth-largest political party in the House of Representatives after winning 14 seats at the 2022 general election and is one of seven national parties recognized by the Election Commission. The party is part of the ruling coalition in Nepal with Ligden serving as deputy prime minister and Ministry of Energy along with two other ministers and a state minister.

History

Founding and early years, 1990–1994 
The Rastriya Prajatantra Party was formed by the ruling elite of the Panchayat era on 29 May 1990. The party split in the same year after another group also registered itself with the Election Commission. Thee two parties had the same name, ideology and statute but different flags and election symbols. The two parties, one led by Surya Bahadur Thapa zand the other led by Lokendra Bahadur Chand, contested the 1991 elections. The two parties won four seats between them with Chand's party winning three seats and Thapa's party winning one seat. Following their performance at the elections the two parties agreed to merge into a single Rastriya Prajatantra Party on 8 February 1992.

The party held its first general convention from in 1992 from 11 to 16 June in Kathmandu and unanimously elected Surya Bahadur Thapa as its chairman. Lokendra Bahadur Chand and Rajeshwor Devkota were elected leader and co-chairman, respectively. The party emerged as a third force at the 1992 local elections and the 1994 general elections. The party received 18 percent of the votes and won 20 seats to the House of Representatives, making them the third largest party in the parliament.

Government and second split, 1995–1999

Coalition governments, 1995–1997 
The party initially supported the minority government of CPN (UML) but later withdrew their support and backed a no-confidence motion against prime minister Manmohan Adhikari. The party then joined a coalition government with Nepali Congress and Nepal Sadbhawana Party under the premiership of Congress leader Sher Bahadur Deuba. A faction of the party led by former prime minister Lokendra Bahadur Chand were dissatisfied with the coalition government and in March 1996 some cabinet ministers close to Chand withdrew their support for the Deuba government and resigned before a no-confidence vote was set to table by the opposition CPN (UML). The ministers withdrew their resignation before the no-confidence vote and Deuba won the confidence vote. Six cabinet ministers close to Chand again resigned from the government in December 1996 but supported Deuba in the confidence vote later and rejoined the cabinet.

Chand and Thapa governments, 1997–1998 
In March 1997 a faction of the party led by Lokendra Bahadur Chand joined a coalition government with CPN (UML), with Chand as prime minister. On 3 October 1997, the faction led by Surya Bahadur Thapa voted for a no-confidence motion tabled by Nepali Congress and toppled the government. Thapa was then made the prime minister on 6 October 1997 with the support of Congress.

After losing support within his party Thapa asked King Birendra to dissolve the house and call for fresh elections. After the recommendation of the Supreme Court, the king called forth a special session of the parliament to debate the no-confidence motion filed against Thapa. Thapa survived the no-confidence vote and expelled six central committee members for threatening to back a no-confidence motion against him.

The second general convention of the party took place from 12 to 16 November 1997 in Birgunj. Surya Bahadur Thapa was re-elected for a second term as chairman. Prakash Chandra Lohani, Pashupati SJB Rana and Kamal Thapa were nominated as vice-chairman, general secretary and spokesman respectively. Lokendra Bahadur Chand however created his own Rastriya Prajatantra Party on 9 January 1998 claiming that Thapa had mismanaged the party, did not listen to the directions of the central committee and accused Thapa of not holding the general election in a fair manner. He broke off with 10 members of parliament including 8 from the House of Representatives and 2 from the National Assembly. Thapa resigned as prime minister on 10 April 1998 and was replaced by Nepali Congress president Girija Prasad Koirala.  

The two parties contested the 1999 elections and fared badly in the election with the party winning 11 seats and the party led by Chand not winning any seats. Following the elections, the parties decided to merge again on 31 December 1999. A group led by Rajeshwar Devkota however decided not to rejoin the party and formed their own Rastriya Prajatantra Party (Nationalist).

Direct rule and internal conflicts, 2002–2015

Second Chand and Thapa governments, 2002–2006 

The king dismissed the government of Sher Bahadur Deuba in 4 October 2002 after failing to conduct the elections following the dissolution of the House of Representatives on May earlier that year. Lokendra Bahadur Chand was then appointed as prime minister on 11 October 2002. He resigned on 31 May 2003 after protests from opposition parties calling for the restoration of the parliament and the formation of a national consensus government. Chand had also faced accusations from within his party of failing to address these issues. He was replaced by Surya Bahadur Thapa on 5 June 2002.

At the third general convention of the party held in Pokhara from 12 to 14 December 2002, Surya Bahadur Thapa completed his second four-year term as party chairman and could not compete for the post of chairman again as per the party constitution. Pashupati SJB Rana was elected chairman during the convention and Padma Sundar Lawati, Kamal Thapa and Rosan Karki were nominated vice-president, general secretary and spokesperson respectively.

There were calls within the party for Surya Bahadur Thapa to resign as prime minister for undermining democracy by failing to form a national consensus government. He resigned on 7 May 2004 and was replaced by Nepali Congress (Democratic) leader Sher Bahadur Deuba. On 4 November 2004, Thapa announced that he would be quitting the party and forming a new centre-right liberal party. The party was formally launched on 13 March 2005 as Rastriya Janashakti Party. 

On 1 February 2005, King Gyanendra dismissed Deuba as prime minister and seized executive powers. The party announced their support for the pro-democracy agitation led by the Seven Party Alliance but ten members of the party's central committee, including Kamal Thapa who had rejoined the party after leaving for Janashakti, supported the coup. Thapa along with six central committee members were appointed to the King's cabinet in December 2005 with Thapa becoming Home Minister.

On 10 January 2006, members of the central committee close to Kamal Thapa voted to replace Pashupati SJB Rana as party chairman with Thapa. Thapa's claim as new chairman was dismissed by other members of the party. Thapa's faction of the party contested the 2006 local elections that was boycotted by the Seven Party Alliance and the Rana faction of the party. The party won mayoral positions in major cities including Kathmandu, Pokhara, Bharatpur and Dhangadhi in an election marred by a lack of candidates, violence and low turnout. The party members that supported Thapa, including six incumbent cabinet ministers, were expelled. On 28 October 2006, they formed their own party, the royalist Rastriya Prajatantra Party Nepal, under the leadership of Kamal Thapa.

Constituent Assembly, 2007–2015 
The party held its fourth general convention from 9 to 11 December 2007 and re-elected Pashupati SJB Rana as party chairman. Following the 2006 revolution a national consensus government under the leadership of Girija Prasad Koirala was formed. The parliament was reinstated and eventually transformed into the Interim Legislature Parliament after including the Maoists. The party had eight seats in the parliament but two MPs, Budhhiman Tamang and Brijesh Kumar Gupta, were dismissed because of their support of the royal coup.

In the 2008 elections the party failed to win a seat from the constituency vote but got 2.45% of the party list votes and won 8 seats to the 1st Constituent Assembly through the party-list proportional representation system. Party chairman Pashupati SJB Rana also lost from Sindhupalchowk 1. On 28 May 2008, at the first session of the 1st Constituent Assembly. The party voted in favor of abolishing the monarchy and turning Nepal into a republic. Lokendra Bahadur Chand who was serving as the parliamentary party leader of the party was absent during the vote. The party joined the Madhav Kumar Nepal led government in June 2009.

At the party's fifth general convention from  17 to 19 May 2013, the Rastriya Janashakti Party merged into the party and Surya Bahadur Thapa was elected as the chairman of the unified party. It was also decided that the senior leadership would rotate annually between Surya Bahadur Thapa, Lokendra Bahadur Chand, Pashupati SJB Rana and Prakash Chandra Lohani. In the 2013 elections, the party won constituency seats in Rupandehi 2, Chitwan 5 and Dhankuta 2 and got 2.75% of the party list votes and won 10 seats through the party-list proportional representation system for a total of 13 seats in the 2nd Constituent Assembly. The party supported the CPN (UML)–Nepali Congress coalition government under Sushil Koirala following the election and sent two ministers to the cabinet.

Federal Nepal, 2016–present

Continued internal conflicts, 2016–2020 
On 21 November 2016, the party announced it's unification with the Kamal Thapa led Rastriya Prajatantra Party Nepal. The new party retained the name of Rastriya Prajatantra Party. The new party had a total strength of 37 in the Parliament of Nepal, becoming the fourth largest party. Thapa was elected as chairman of the party in a special general convention in Kathmandu in February 2017. The party joined the coalition government on 9 March 2017 under CPN (Maoist Centre) chairman Pushpa Kamal Dahal with Kamal Thapa serving as deputy prime minister. Prakash Chandra Lohani split away from the party following the decision to join the government and because of issues regarding the electoral symbol of the party. He announced the formation of Ekikrit Rastriya Prajatantra Party (Nationalist) on 29 March 2017. Another split occurred on 6 August 2017 after Pashupati SJB Rana broke away forming Rastriya Prajatantra Party (Democratic). The party joined the coalition government under Nepali Congress president Sher Bahadur Deuba on 13 October 2017 with Kamal Thapa again serving as deputy prime minister. 

In the 2017 general and provincial elections, Rastriya Prajantatra Party formed an alliance with Nepali Congress and Rastriya Prajatantra Party (Democratic). The party only won one seat to the House of Representatives and party chairman Kamal Thapa lost in Makwanpur 1. Only general secretary Rajendra Lingden was elected from Jhapa 3 after forging an electoral pact with the Left Alliance against Nepali Congress in some eastern districts including Jhapa. The party got 2.06% of the party list votes and could not become a national party after failing to pass the 3% threshold in party list voting. The party also won one seat each to provincial assemblies of Province 1, Province 3 and Province 6.

Re-unification and new leadership, 2020–present 

The Rastriya Prajatantra Party (Samyukta), created through the merger of Rana and Lohani's splinter groups, merged with the party on 12 March 2020, with Kamal Thapa, Pashupati Shamsher Jang Bahadur Rana and Prakash Chandra Lohani all acting as chairs. In July 2020, Sunil Bahadur Thapa, the son of former prime minister Surya Bahadur Thapa, resigned from the party and joined Nepali Congress. The party conducted its general convention from 1 to 3 December 2021 and elected Rajendra Prasad Lingden as the party's chairman. He defeated  former deputy prime minister and incumbent party chairman Kamal Thapa at the general convention. The party also announced that it had 150,000 active party members. The general convention also elected Nepalgunj mayor Dhawal Shamsher Rana as the party's general secretary and former member of constituent assembly Bikram Pandey as the party vice-president. Following the general convention, Kamal Thapa left the party and revived the Rastriya Prajatantra Party Nepal. 

The party announced intentions to unify other pro-monarchist groups under their umbrella and groups including Nepal Ka Lagi Nepali Campaign, Mission Nepal, Gorach Abhiyan and the Gyanendra Shahi led Hamro Nepal Hami Nepali Campaign joined the party in the following months. Former chairman of Bibeksheel Sajha Party, Rabindra Mishra also joined the party on 28 September 2022 as senior vice-president.

The party fielded 140 candidates to the House of Representatives at the 2022 general and provincial elections and forged an election pact with CPN (UML) in Jhapa, Banke and Rupandehi districts. Party chairman Rajendra Lingden retained his seat in Jhapa 3 and the party gained 6 more direct seats. The party also got 5.58% of the party list vote to become one of seven national parties in the Federal Parliament. The party won 7 proportional seats for a total of 14 seats at the House of Representatives. The party was also successful in winning seats to all seven provincial assemblies.

Ideology 
The Rastriya Prajatantra Party was established as an alternative force to the major political parties, Nepali Congress and Communist Party of Nepal (Unified Marxist–Leninist). The party was founded on the principles of democracy, constitutional monarchy, nationalism and economic liberalism. At the time of the party's foundation Surya Bahadur Thapa's party was considered as the more liberal party and Lokendra Bahadur Chand's party was considered as the more conservative party.

Monarchy and federal structure 
At the first session of the 1st Constituent Assembly, the party voted to abolish the monarchy and turn Nepal into a secular republic. Later however, the party advocated for turning Nepal into a Hindu republic. Rastriya Prajatantra Party Nepal, a splinter group of the party which had voted against abolishing the monarchy changed its constitution to support the re-establishment of the Hindu state and a return to constitutional monarchy. After the merger between the two parties in November 2016 it was announced that the unified party would take up the constitution of Rastriya Prajatantra Party Nepal. The party has stated support for a Sanatan Hindu state with full religious freedom and registered an amendment proposal for such on 19 March 2017. The Election Commission removed the portion of the party statute that advocated for a Hindu state and monarchy on 17 March 2017 and asked the party to remove the provisions again on 22 January 2022 claiming that it was against Article 260 of the Constitution of Nepal.

The party supports a ceremenional monarch, a directly elected prime minister and a fully proportional parliament. The party also calls for the scrapping of the provincial governments claiming that it is an expensive experiment. The party wants to instead strengthen the local governments and create a two-tier federal structure.

Electoral performance

Legislative elections

Provincial elections

Province 1

Madhesh

Bagmati

Gandaki

Lumbini

Karnali

Sudurpashchim

Leadership

Chairmen 

 Surya Bahadur Thapa (1990–2002, 2013–2014)
 Pashupati SJB Rana (2002–2013, 2014–2016, 2020–2021)
 Kamal Thapa (2016–2021)
 Prakash Chandra Lohani (2020–2021)
 Rajendra Lingden (2021–present)

Prime Ministers

Current leadership

Provincial committee chairmans

List of Members of Parliament 

Members of Pratinidhi Sabha from Rastriya Prajatantra Party

See also 
 Rastriya Prajatantra Party Nepal
 General Convention of Rastriya Prajatantra Party (2021)

References

External links 
 Party website
 Info on the party from FES

Conservative parties in Nepal
National conservative parties
Nepalese nationalism
Hindu nationalism in Nepal
Monarchist parties in Nepal
Nepalese Hindu political parties
Hindutva
1990 establishments in Nepal
Right-wing parties
Right-wing populism in Asia
Social conservative parties